Enrico Lorenzo Macam Pineda (born August 12, 1990), is a Filipino actor. He is the finalist who won the title of First Prince in the GMA Network's fifth season of StarStruck. He is the son of former congressman Enrico Pineda and publicist Macy Macam Pineda.

He is currently a contract artist of ABS-CBN's Star Magic.

Personal life
Enzo's father, Enrico Pineda, is Manny Pacquiao's business manager, PBA San Miguel and Former F.E.U. Captain Ball and M.V.P. (Arwin Santos and Mark Pogoy) Basket Ball Varsity Player and Ateneo de Manila University Blue Eagles team manager, and Mayor, and his Mother Macy Pineda is a publicist & PR V.P.. for Magazines

He went to school in Holy Infant Montessori Center and La Salle Greenhills Grade School for a while. He attended Lyceum of the Philippines University (L.P.U.), taking up Hospitality Management. He is studying business administration at the University of Santo Tomas (U.S.T.).

Pineda is also a martial arts practitioner he does boxing, muay Thai, fencing and gymnastics. He was a soccer, tae kwon do, and base ball varsity player during his last years at U.S.T.G.S.B.. He was a member of a dance group called troupe in U.P. and was also a member of his school's theater group U.S.T. Theater Dance Guild Head.

In 2021, he became a Marine reservist after completing the basic citizen military course under the Philippine Navy with the rank of staff sergeant.

Health
In 2020, Pineda tested positive for the COVID-19 virus. He recovered in September of the same year.

StarStruck

StarStruck standing

Filmography

Film

Television

Awards and nominations

References

External links

 
 Official website
 Enzo Pineda at iGMA.tv

1990 births
Living people
StarStruck (Philippine TV series) participants
Filipino male child actors
Filipino male television actors
Star Magic
GMA Network personalities
ABS-CBN personalities
Tagalog people
People from Makati
People from Quezon City
Male actors from Metro Manila
University of Asia and the Pacific alumni